Yeli may refer to:

 Yeli, India, a village, List of villages in Pathardi taluka, in Pathardi taluka, Ahmednagar district, Maharashtra State, India
 Yeli-ye Olya
 Yeli-ye Sofla